Sprinter can refer to:

In sport 
 A participant in sprint (running)
 Sprinter (cycling), a type of racing cyclist
 Sprint train, a group of road bicycle racers who at the end of a race work together to set a high pace to help their sprinter
 A sprint car racing vehicle

Motor vehicles 
 Mercedes-Benz Sprinter (or 'Dodge Sprinter', 'Freightliner Sprinter'), a cargo van
 Toyota Sprinter, a compact car

Trains 
 Sprinter (British Rail), a family of diesel multiple units built for British Rail in the 1980s
 NS SGMm (Stadsgewestelijk Materieel), a Dutch electric multiple unit in service since 1975, commonly referred to as "Sprinter old generation"
 NS Sprinter Lighttrain, a Dutch electric multiple unit in service since 2009
 Sprinter (rail line), a hybrid rail service in San Diego County, California
 Sprinter New Generation, a Dutch train manufactured by Construcciones y Auxiliar de Ferrocarriles
 V/Line Sprinter, a diesel multiple unit operated by V/Line in Australia

Other 
 Sprinter (computer)
 Sprinter (album)
 Sprinter (film), a sports film
Sprinter (manga)
 Sprinters, an Australian in-house brand of chips sold by supermarket chain Aldi.

See also 
 Sprint (disambiguation)